Andrew Forbes Mobberly (born 10 March 1992) is a Samoan footballer who plays as a forward for Greenhithe Catimba and the Samoa national football team.

Mobberly was born in Auckland, New Zealand. He has previously played for Queenstown Rovers, Southern United, East Coast Bays, and Albany United. In 2022 he is coaching Albany United.

Career

He was first selected for the Samoa national football team in 2015 for its 2018 world cup qualifier campaign. He was subsequently selected for the team for the 2016 OFC Nations Cup. In June 2019 he was named to the squad for the 2019 Pacific Games.

International goals
Scores and results list Samoa's goal tally first.

References

External links
 

1992 births
Living people
Samoan footballers
Samoa international footballers
Association football forwards
2016 OFC Nations Cup players